This is a list of governors for Norrbotten County of Sweden. Norrbotten County separated from Västerbotten County in 1810; for a list of governors who ruled the area before that date, see List of governors of Västerbotten County.

Footnotes

References

Norrbotten